Lusi is a village located in the Finnish municipality Heinola in the Päijänne Tavastia region, in the Province of Southern Finland. It is where Finnish national road 5 meets Finnish national road 4. 

In 2009 Lusi was nominated village of the year.

History 
Lusi was first mentioned in 1470. It was originally a farm name, derived from a folk form of the Christian given name Ambrosius (Brusi > Blusi > Lusi).

Lusi was a part of Heinolan maalaiskunta until its consolidation with the town of Heinola in 1997.

External links 
lusi.fi

References

Villages in Finland
Heinola